Aroga chlorocrana is a moth of the family Gelechiidae. It is found in North America, where it has been recorded from Texas.

The wingspan is about 19 mm. The forewings are blackish-fuscous. The hindwings are light grey with an expansible whitish hairpencil from the base lying 
along the edge of the costa to near the middle.

References

Moths described in 1927
Aroga
Moths of North America